Gerdt Bernhard von Bassewitz-Hohenluckow (4 January 1878 in Allewind, Kingdom of Württemberg – 6 February 1923 in Berlin) was a lieutenant in the Prussian militia, a playwright, and an actor. He had his only great success with Peter and Anneli's Journey to the Moon (Peterchens Mondfahrt), which began as a successful stage play in 1912 in Leipzig and was published as a book in 1915.

It became one of the best-loved German children's books and has been a bestseller in Germany to this day. After his success, von Bassewitz became assistant stage director in Cologne. Eventually he moved to Berlin, where he made a living as a freelance writer.

See also 
 Bassewitz

External links

 
 
 

1878 births
1923 deaths
People from Heidenheim (district)
People from the Kingdom of Württemberg
German male stage actors
Bassewitz family
Writers from Baden-Württemberg
20th-century German male actors
German male writers